The Center for Academic Research and Training in Anthropogeny (CARTA) is an Organized Research Unit (ORU) at the University of California, San Diego.  Formally established in 2008, CARTA is a collaboration between faculty members of UCSD main campus, the UCSD School of Medicine, the Salk Institute for Biological Studies, and interested scientists at other institutions from around the world.

CARTA was formed in order to promote transdisciplinary research into anthropogeny - the study of human origins - drawing on methods from a number of traditional disciplines spanning the humanities, social, biomedical, biological, computational & engineering and physical & chemical sciences.

History of CARTA

Before CARTA became an established and formal UCSD recognized Organized Research Unit, a multidisciplinary effort to study human origins had already been underway in the La Jolla area for over a decade, coordinated by the UCSD Project for Explaining the Origin of Humans (POH). The group involved local experts in San Diego as well as many others throughout the world. The primary activity of the group was to organize multi-disciplinary interactions amongst members (via meetings in La Jolla), and via secure internet-based mechanisms. These efforts have now been converted into a larger and more publicly active research program, which facilitate graduate and postgraduate education in relevant departments and programs.

Mission statement

"Use all rational and ethical approaches to seek all verifiable facts from all relevant disciplines to explore and explain the origins of the human phenomenon, while minimizing complex organizational structures and hierarchies, and avoiding unnecessary paperwork and bureaucracy.  In the process, raise awareness and understanding of the study of human origins within the academic community and the public at large."

Organization and leadership

The co-directors of the Institute are  Ajit Varki, Professor of Medicine and Cellular & Molecular  Medicine, UCSD,  Margaret Schoeninger, Professor and former Chair of the Department of  Anthropology, UCSD, and Fred Gage, Professor, Salk Institute for Biological Studies, and Adjunct Professor of Neurosciences,  UCSD

Activities
The Center sponsors a symposium series on human origins for both researchers and the public. It also partners with other San Diego institutions and organizations in sponsoring public lectures

It offers a graduate specialization available to students in participating PhD programs at UC San Diego.

It also compiles a chronological list of book titles relevant to exploring human origins and human evolution.

It houses the Museum of Primatology, a collection of chimpanzee and human skeletons, which are currently undergoing 3D digitization and IT integration.

CARTA does not directly fund or organize research by its members, but provides a forum for researchers in varied fields to come together "to explore and explain the human phenomenon.”

Areas of interest
 Human and primate genetics and evolution
 Paleoanthropology and hominid origins
 Mammalian and primate neuroscience
 Primate biology and medicine
 Language, communication and cognition
 Nature-nurture interactions in explaining language and cognition
 Human and primate society and culture
 Comparative developmental biology of primates
 General theories for explaining humans

References

External links

University of California, San Diego
Biological research institutes in the United States
Research institutes in California
Research institutes established in 2008
2008 establishments in California